Dragana Kršenković Brković (Драгана Кршенковић Брковић) is a Montenegrin writer.

Biography
Kršenkovic Brković graduated from the Faculty of Political Sciences and from the Faculty of Drama Arts. TV Belgrade screened her play -  Vrele kapi in 1981. She wrote it for an entrance examination.

As the Wars in the Balkans erupted, she moved from Belgrade, Serbia, to Podgorica, Montenegro. There, Kršenković Brković established a puppet theater called The Blue Lagoon, with her husband, Tomislav Brković. Details of this theater can be found in the bilingual monograph Puppet Theatre Blue Lagoon (Podgorica, 2019) 

Kršenković Brković was a Hubert Humphrey fellow 2005-06, which is a Fulbright Exchange Program. She spent a year in Washington DC, US. She also received an Austrian Government grant in order to carry out research at the University of Graz in Austria in 2008.

Kršenković Brković was a guest writer in residential programs in the US (the apexart New York City Fellowship, NYC, 2014; Writers Omi, Ledig House, NY, 2017), Hungary (Pecs Writers Program, Pecs, 2013), and Austria (Writers in Residence program, KulturKontakt Austria, Vienna, 2011). Besides, she participated in Rhodes, Greece (1st International Forum for a Culture of Peace by Mediterranean Women Creators, under the auspice of UNESCO ); Bologna, Italy (The Bologna Book Fair, 2011); Bratislava, Slovakia (23rd Biennial of Illustration, BIB, 2011), etc.

Her plays are performed in many Balkan countries. Four of her plays are set texts for elementary schools in Montenegro and Macedonia. Her book The Genie of Lake Manito was selected for the 2011 White Ravens Awards  by the Internationale Jugendbibliothek in Munich, Germany. She has been nominated for Astrid Lindgren Memorial Award (ALMA) ten times (2008-2018). Two feature movies, Hozentarus (2018)  and The Magic Key (2020), based on her fairy tales with the same titles, have been filmed by Public Broadcasting Services of Montenegro, RTCG.

Her stories have been published in many international magazines: Buchkultur, Blesok, Sarajevo Notebook, ARS, etc.

Kršenković Brković has published three novels, two story collections, one collection of drama plays, two monographs, and several children's books.

Works
Fiction
 Dva talasa / Two Waves
 Atelanska igra / The Atellan Farce
 Izgubljeni pečat / The Lost Seal
 Vatra u Aleksandriji / The Fire in Alexandria
 Iza nevidljivog zida / Behind the Invisible Wall
 Gospodarska palata / The Master's Palace

Children's books
 Tajna jedne Tajne - Secret's Secret /bilingual/
 Modra planina / The Blue Mountain
 Muzičar s cilindrom i cvetom na reveru / Musician with a Cylinder and a Flower on His Lapel
 Tajna jedne Tajne / Secret's Secret
 Duh Manitog jezera / The Genie of Lake Manito
 Tajna plavog kristala /The Secret of a Blue Crystal

Non-fiction
 Fragmenti: Zapisi o književnosti / Fragments: Records About Literature 
 Poetika prolaznosti: Organizacija vremena u "Ranim jadima" Danila Kiša / The Poetics of Impermanence: Organisation of Time in Danilo Kiš's "Early Sorrows"
 Onirizam Edgara Alana Poa i egzistencijalni nemir Alise Ostrajker / Edgar Allan Poe's Oneirism and the Existential Angst of Alicia Ostriker
 Feministička revizija mitologije: Razbijanje patrijarhalnih obrazaca identifikacije žene u klasičnim bajkama / Feminist Revision of Mythology: Breaking the Patriarchal Patterns of the Women Identification in Classic Fairy Tales
 Zaboravljeno putovanje - tragovi utisnuti u bajkama / Forgotten Journey - Traces Imprinted in Fairy Tales

References

External links
 Official website

Year of birth missing (living people)
Living people
Montenegrin writers
Montenegrin women writers
Feminist writers
Montenegrin women children's writers
Women dramatists and playwrights